Notker Wolf (born June 21, 1940) is a  German Benedictine monk, priest, abbot, musician, and author. He is a member of St. Ottilien Archabbey located in Bavaria, Germany, which is part of the Benedictine Congregation of Saint Ottilien. He previously was elected and served as the ninth Abbot Primate of the Benedictine Confederation of the Order of Saint Benedict.  He was elected to his position as Abbot Primate in 2000 and ended his final term in 2016.

Biography

Early life
Werner Wolf was born as the son of a tailor in Bad Grönenbach in the Allgäu region of Germany. He undertook his early education at Oberrealschule Memmingen (today Bernhard-Strigel-Gymnasium) and at the Rhabanus-Maurus-Gymnasium St. Ottilien where he graduated high school in 1961. He then petitioned to enter the Benedictine monastery of St. Ottilien Archabbey.

Monastic life
Wolf made his profession as a Benedictine monk on September 17, 1962, and was given the name "Notker" in honor of Saint Notker. He then began his philosophical studies in Rome, Italy, at the Benedictine Pontificio Ateneo Sant'Anselmo. In 1965, he began studies at the Ludwig Maximilian University of Munich where he concentrated in the interdisciplinary fields of theology, philosophy, and natural sciences (zoology, inorganic chemistry, and the history of astronomy). He would be ordained a Roman Catholic priest on September 1, 1968, at St. Ottilien Archabbey. In 1970, Wolf would return to Rome and be appointed a professor of Natural Philosophy and Philosophy of Science at the Pontificio Ateneo Sant'Anselmo. In 1974, he would complete his doctor of philosophy (Dr. Phil.) degree from the same institution with a dissertation entitled "Das zyklische Weltmodell der Stoa. Ein Beitrag zur Geschichte von der Ewigen Wiederkehr des Gleichen (The cyclical world model of the Stoa: A contribution to the history of the eternal return of the same)." 

Three years later, on October 1, 1977, Wolf was elected as the fifth Archabbot of St. Ottilien Archabbey. This also meant he became the Abbot President of the Benedictine Congregation of Saint Ottilien with monasteries and foundations scattered throughout the world. At the time this congregation had over twenty monasteries and over 1,100 monks throughout the world. Monks of this congregation are known as "Missionary Monks" and Wolf fulfilled his mandate by building hospitals, schools, colleges, and monasteries throughout the world. 

On September 7, 2000, over 260 of the abbots of the Benedictine Confederation gathered in Rome and elected Wolf as the 9th Abbot Primate of the Order of St. Benedict. Although an "Abbot Primate" possesses little real authority over autonomous monasteries or congregations of monks, this position does allow him to serve as the visible presence of the Benedictine Order to the larger world. The office of Abbot Primate was created by Pope Leo XIII in 1886 to serve the Benedictine community as its liaison to the Vatican and civil authorities, to promote unity among the various autonomous Benedictine monasteries and congregations, and to represent the order at religious gatherings around the globe. The Abbot Primate resides at the primatial abbey of Sant'Anselmo all'Aventino in Rome, as well as serves as the "Grand Chancellor" to the Pontificio Ateneo Sant'Anselmo. With the election of Abbot Gregory Polan as the new Abbot Primate on September 9, 2016, Wolf had completed sixteen years of service to the Benedictine Confederation.

Wolf returned to his home abbey of St. Ottilien and continues his life as a monk. He had always been skilled at music, which he expressed both in the composition of Gregorian chant, the playing of the flute, and the enjoyment of playing the electric guitar in a rock band known as "Feedback." His continued passions include inter-religious dialogue, environmental issues, responsible immigration policies, and ethical leadership and management.

Bibliography
Wolf has numerous books, articles, interviews, videos, music CD's, and online streaming platform content. His books, musical compositions, and articles have been translated into over twenty different languages. He is also catalogued in the German National Library. Just a few of his more prominent works are:

Books
 Freisein für Gott. Einübung in die Geistliche Lesung (with Johanna Domek), Bonifatius-Druckerei, Paderborn 2004
 Worauf warten wir? Ketzerische Gedanken zu Deutschland (with Leo G. Linder), Rowohlt-Taschenbuch-Verlag, Reinbek bei Hamburg 2006
 Die Kunst, Menschen zu führen (with Enrica Rosanna & Leo G. Linder), Rowohlt-Taschenbuch-Verlag, Reinbek bei Hamburg 2007
 The art of leadership (English version), Liturgical Press, Collegeville 2013
 Die Botschaft Benedikts. Die Weisheit seiner Äbte und Äbtissinnen, Vier Türme, Münsterschwarzach 2008
 Aus heiterem Himmel. Einfälle und Eingebungen für das Leben hier unten, Rowohlt-Taschenbuch-Verlag, Reinbek bei Hamburg 2008
 Im Schatten des großen Drachen. Begegnungen mit Chinas Christen (with Corinna Mühlstedt), Kreuz-Verlag, Stuttgart 2008
 Regeln zum Leben. Die Zehn Gebote – Provokation und Orientierung für heute (with Matthias Drobinski), Herder, Freiburg im Breisgau 2008
 Wie mit neuen Augen. Weg-Begleiter für Pilger (with Audio-CD), Butzon & Bercker, Kevelaer 2008
 Gott segne Sie! Neue Einfälle für das Leben hier unten, Rowohlt-Taschenbuch-Verlag, Reinbek bei Hamburg February 2009
 Von den Mönchen lernen, Pattloch, April 2009
 Gönn dir Zeit. Es ist dein Leben, Herder, Freiburg im Breisgau April 2009
 Make time for yourself: it's your time (English version), D.K. Printworld, New Delhi 2010
 Wohin pilgern wir? Alte Wege und neue Ziele, Rowohlt-Taschenbuch-Verlag, Reinbek bei Hamburg September 2009
 Mitten im Leben wird Gott geboren (with Corinna Mühlstedt), Herder, Freiburg im Breisgau September 2010
 Alles Gute kommt von Oben. Kleine Wahrheiten für zwischendurch, Rowohlt-Taschenbuch-Verlag, Reinbek bei Hamburg November 2010
 Die sieben Säulen des Glücks, Herder, Freiburg im Breisgau January 2011
 Schmetterlinge im Bauch, Herder, Freiburg im Breisgau March 2011
 Faith can give us wings: the art of letting go (English version), Paraclete Press, Brewster, MA 2013
 Das kleine Buch der wahren Freiheit, Herder, Freiburg im Breisgau September 2011
 Erfüllte Zeit: Ermutigungen für das Leben, St. Benno Verlag December 2011
 JETZT ist die Zeit für den Wandel. Nachhaltig leben, für eine gute Zukunft (with Alfons Kifmann), Herder, Freiburg im Breisgau April 2012
 Seien Sie unbesorgt! Vorschläge für ein erfülltes Leben, Knaur TB, August 2012
 Jesus: Ein Leben (with Leo G. Linder), Gütersloher Verlagshaus, August 2012
 Die sieben Säulen des Glücks. Tugenden für das Leben, Herder, Freiburg im Breisgau 2012
 Spiritus loci – vom Geist des Ortes. Ein spirituelles Reisebuch (with Alfons Kifmann), Schnell & Steiner, Regensburg 2014
 Das Böse. Wie unsere Welt aus den Fugen gerät (with Leo G. Linder), Gütersloher Verlagshaus, Gütersloh 2014
 Evil: how our culture is going off the rails (English version), D.K. Printworld, New Delhi 2016
 Altwerden beginnt im Kopf – Jungbleiben auch (with Leo G. Linder), adeo-Verlag, 2015
 Aging starts in your mind: you're only as old as you feel (English version), Paraclete Press, Brewster, MA 2017
 Läuft. Pessimisten stehen im Regen. Optimisten duschen unter Wolken, adeo-Verlag, 2016
 Schluss mit der Angst – Deutschland schafft sich nicht ab! (with Simon Biallowons), Herder, Freiburg im Breisgau 2017
 Gute Vorsätze. Beim nächsten Mal wird alles anders (with Alfons Kifmann), Gütersloher Verlagshaus, Gütersloh 2017
 Das Unmögliche denken, das Mögliche wagen. Visionen für eine bessere Zukunft (with Alfons Kifmann), Gütersloher Verlagshaus, Gütersloh 2019
 Leadership in the context of religious institutions: the case of Benedictine Monasteries (with Günter Müller-Stewens) editors, Springer, Cham 2019
 Ich denke an Sie die Kunst, einfach da zu sein (with Simon Biallowons), Herder, Freiburg im Breisgau 2020
 Warum ich an Freiheit und Verantwortung glaube, Leipzig Benno 2020
 Donne-toi le temps de vivre: conseils d'un moine globe-trotter surbooké abbé-primat émérite de l'ordre bénédictin (with Marie-Noëlle Villedieu de Torcy), Nouan-le-Fuzelier 2020
 Die Sehnsucht nach dem Ursprung ist die Sehnsucht nach einem neuen Anfang (with Hans-Günther Kaufmann), Leipzig Benno 2021

Discography 
 Notker Wolf with "Feedback": Rock My Soul, (Rock-Audio-CD) Point Music, April 2003
 Notker Wolf with "Inka Stampfl": Weiherserenade. Französische Kammermusik aus drei Jahrhunderten, (Audio-CD) EOS-Verlag, St. Ottilien 2008
 Notker Wolf with "Carlo Günther": Notker Wolf liest "Wohin pilgern wir?" Alte Wege und neue Ziele, (Audio-CD) Hörbuch Hamburg, Hamburg 2010
 Notker Wolf: Notker Wolf plays Bach, (Audio-CD) Herder, Freiburg im Breisgau June 2011
 Notker Wolf with "Feedback": No Lies, (Rock-Audio-CD) Transformer (Membran), April 2012

Gallery

See also
 Paolo Rumiz: Der unendliche Faden. Reise zu den Benediktinern, den Erbauern Europas, Aus dem Ital. von Karin Fleischanderl, Folio Verlag, Wien/Bozen 2020
 Marlis Prinzing: Notker Wolf. 'Die Gnade des Gehorsams hat mir die Welt geöffnet' , In: Meine Wut rettet mich Kösel, München 2012
 Vera Krause: Abtprimas Notker Wolf. Grenzgänger zwischen Himmel und Erde. – Die Biografie, Verlag Vier Türme, Münsterschwarzach 2010
 Petra Altmann: Die 101 wichtigsten Fragen – Orden und Klosterleben. Mit Antworten von Abtprimas Notker Wolf, Beck, München 2011

References

External links
 Archabbey of St. Ottilien (in German)
 Congregation of St. Ottilien (in German and English)
 The Benedictine Confederation of Congregations of Monasteries of the Order of Saint Benedict (in Italian and English)
 International Atlas of Benedictine Monasteries (in English)
 Pontificio Ateneo Sant'Anselmo (in Italian and English
 Official site of the rock group "FEEDBACK" (in German)

|-

German Benedictines
Performers of Christian rock music
1940 births
Living people
Abbots Primate
Commanders Crosses of the Order of Merit of the Federal Republic of Germany
Members of the European Academy of Sciences and Arts
German abbots
Benedictine abbots
German male non-fiction writers
German
21st-century German theologians
German Roman Catholic theologians